The name Third Fleet or 3rd fleet can refer to:

 Third Fleet (United Kingdom)
 United States Third Fleet
 Third Fleet (Australia), part of the British effort of the late eighteenth century to colonise Australia
 IJN 3rd Fleet, Imperial Japanese Navy
 Third Fleet, an organizational unit of the Republic of Korea Navy
 Luftflotte 3

See also
 
 
 
 
 Third (disambiguation)
 Fleet (disambiguation)
 Second Fleet (disambiguation)
 Fourth Fleet (disambiguation)